Vladislav Vyacheslavovich Ignatyev (born 20 January 1987) is a Russian professional footballer. He plays as a right-back or right midfielder.

Club career

He made his debut in the Russian Premier League on 10 April 2009 for FC Krylia Sovetov Samara in a game against FC Khimki.

In December 2009, the RFU labour disputes committee made Ignatyev a free agent, which enabled him to leave Krylia Sovetov and join any other club. On 25 December 2009, Ignatyev signed a 5-year contract with Lokomotiv.

On 29 May 2012, Ignatyev signed for FC Krasnodar.

On 10 February 2016, he returned to FC Lokomotiv Moscow.

On 30 June 2021, he signed a one-year contract with FC Rubin Kazan.

Career statistics

Notes

International
In 2015, he was called up for the Russia national football team for the first time. He made his debut for the national team on 14 November 2015 in a game against Portugal.

On 11 May 2018, he was included in Russia's extended 2018 FIFA World Cup squad as a back-up. He was not included in the finalized World Cup squad.

Honours
Lokomotiv Moscow
Russian Premier League: 2017–18
Russian Cup: 2016–17, 2018–19, 2020–21

References

External links
 
  Profile at Lokomotiv Moscow official website
 

1987 births
Living people
People from Naberezhnye Chelny
Russian footballers
Russia national football B team footballers
Russia international footballers
Association football midfielders
FC Neftekhimik Nizhnekamsk players
FC KAMAZ Naberezhnye Chelny players
PFC Krylia Sovetov Samara players
FC Lokomotiv Moscow players
FC Kuban Krasnodar players
FC Krasnodar players
FC Rubin Kazan players
Russian Premier League players
Russian First League players
Russian Second League players
Sportspeople from Tatarstan